This is a list of German language names for places located in Slovenia. Slovenia was formerly controlled by the German-speaking country Austria, so historical Austrian districts are also listed.

History

Until 1866, the only official language used in the Austrian Empire's administration was German. Locations had an additional German name, but some place names were only Germanized versions of the original Slavic names.

The compromise of 1867 (which became a law in 1871) marked the start of a recognition of areas where an important proportion of another language was used.

Many towns and villages received another name after 1867, except where there was a German-speaking majority.

List of names

See also

German exonyms
List of European exonyms

References

External links
 The early 1900s gazetteer of Austria-Hungary

Slovenia
Lists of place names
German exonyms
Geographic history of Slovenia